Gary Michael Stenlund (born August 7, 1940) is an American athlete. He competed in the men's javelin throw at the 1968 Summer Olympics.  Throwing for Oregon State University, he finished second at the 1960 NCAA Championships.

Stenlund's career was probably held back by his problem with alcoholism which showed even during his participation in the Olympic Trials.  He was well into his 40s before he achieved sobriety following several DUI arrests.

Returning to Masters competition, he is the current World Record holder in the M75 Javelin throw.  He is also the former M70 world record holder, set in Sacramento, California, while winning the Masters Athletics World Championships.

References

External links
 

1940 births
Living people
Athletes (track and field) at the 1968 Summer Olympics
American male javelin throwers
Olympic track and field athletes of the United States
People from Longview, Washington
Pan American Games medalists in athletics (track and field)
Pan American Games silver medalists for the United States
Athletes (track and field) at the 1967 Pan American Games
Medalists at the 1967 Pan American Games